The Chicago, St. Louis and New Orleans Railroad was a 19th- and early-20th-century railway company in Kentucky in the United States. It operated from 1878, when it purchased the Central Mississippi, until 1951, when it was purchased by the Illinois Central.

In 1896, it purchased the Chesapeake, Ohio and Southwestern Railroad and those former rights-of-way currently form parts of the class-II Paducah and Louisville. In 1897, it purchased the Short Route Railway Transfer Company; the Ohio Valley Railway; and the Owensboro, Falls of Rough and Green River Railroad. In 1902, it purchased the Kentucky Western and the Hodgenville and Elizabethtown Railways. In 1913, it purchased the Paducah Union Depot Company and the Kentucky Valley Railroad. In 1922, it purchased the Kentucky Midland.

The Chicago, St. Louis & New Orleans connected with the Owensboro and Nashville Railway (and later the L&N) at Central City in Muhlenberg County.

See also
 List of Kentucky railroads

Defunct Kentucky railroads
Defunct companies based in Kentucky